KTFD-TV (channel 50) is a television station in Denver, Colorado, United States, affiliated with the Spanish-language UniMás network. It is owned by Entravision Communications, which provides certain services to Boulder-licensed Univision-owned station KCEC (channel 14) under a local marketing agreement (LMA) with TelevisaUnivision. Both stations share studios on Mile High Stadium West Circle in Denver, while KTFD-TV's transmitter is located atop Lookout Mountain, near Golden.

History
The station first signed on the air on February 22, 1996 as KTVJ. Founded by Roberts Broadcasting, it originally aired programming from the Home Shopping Network. In January 2003, Roberts sold the station to Univision Communications. Two months later on March 10, 2003, the station changed its call sign to KTFD-TV (which was modified to KTFD-DT on June 23, 2009, in correspondence with the callsign modifications to the "-DT" suffix applied by all Univision-owned stations following the digital television transition), and became an owned-and-operated station of Univision's secondary network TeleFutura.

KTFD's signal was formerly relayed on low-power analog translator station KDVT-LP (channel 36) in Denver, which was owned by Entravision Communications. The translator was never converted to digital, and its license was canceled on September 13, 2017.

On December 4, 2017, as part of a channel swap made by Entravision Communications, KTFD and sister station KCEC swapped channel numbers, with KTFD moving from digital channel 15 and virtual channel 14 to digital channel 26 and virtual channel 50.

On January 9, 2019, KTFD completed the migration to digital channel 28 from digital 26 as part of the FCC spectrum auction repack.

Technical information

Subchannels
The station's digital channel is multiplexed

Analog-to-digital conversion
KTFD-TV shut down its analog signal, over UHF channel 14, on June 12, 2009, the official date in which full-power television in the United States transitioned from analog to digital broadcasts under federal mandate. The station's digital signal remained on its pre-transition UHF channel 15. Through the use of PSIP, digital television receivers display the station's virtual channel as its former UHF analog channel 14.

References

Television channels and stations established in 1996
1996 establishments in Colorado
TFD-TV
UniMás network affiliates
Bounce TV affiliates
GetTV affiliates
Ion Mystery affiliates
TFD-TV
Entravision Communications stations